Mascali (Sicilian: Màscali) is a comune (municipality) in the Metropolitan City of Catania in the Italian region Sicily, located about  east of Palermo and about  northeast of Catania.

The town of Mascali was entirely rebuilt after its almost complete destruction by lava from the nearby Etna in 1928.

References

External links
 Official website
 Mascali News, Reports, History

Cities and towns in Sicily